The 2017–18 Maltese FA Trophy was the 80th version of the football tournament. It was sponsored by Boost Diesel, which was revealed during the draws of the first, second and third round of the Maltese FA Trophy at the Trophies Lounge in Malta Football Association headquarters in Ta' Qali. A total of sixty–four clubs participated in this season's cup competition.

Floriana were the defending champions, but were eliminated in the Third round by Naxxar Lions in the third round on 2 December 2017. The winners of the trophy were Valletta who won their 14th title following a 2–1 win over Birkirkara in the final. Despite losing the final, Birkirkara earned a place in the first qualifying round of the 2018–19 UEFA Europa League, as Valletta had already qualified for the a European competition following their league triumph.

Format
The Maltese FA Trophy this season was a single elimination tournament between 64 clubs. Matches which were level after regulation advanced to extra time and afterwards to penalties to determine a winner, when needed.

Schedule

Preliminary round
Five preliminary round matches were played on 2–3 September 2017. The draw for the preliminary, first, and second rounds was held 7 August 2017.

First round
Nine first round matches were played on 9–20 September 2017. The draw for the preliminary, first, and second rounds was held 7 August 2017.

Second round
Eighteen second round matches were played on 21–22 October 2017. The draw for the preliminary, first, and second rounds was held 7 August 2017. All teams from Maltese First Division and Maltese Second Division entered in the Second round.

Third round
Sixteen third round matches were played on 1–3 December 2017. The draw for the third and fourth rounds was held 13 November 2017.  All teams from Maltese Premier League entered in the Third round.

Fourth round
Eight fourth round matches were played on 19-21 January 2018. The draw for the third and fourth rounds was held 13 November 2017. In the Fourth Round there were 10 clubs from Maltese Premier League left, 4 clubs from Maltese First Division left and 2 clubs from Gozo Football League left.

Quarter-finals
Four quarter-final matches were played on 17 February 2018. The draw for the Quarter-finals was held 22 January 2018. The round included the two teams from Maltese First Division that were still in the competition: Qrendi and Zejtun Corinthians.

Semi-finals
Two semi-final matches were played on 28 and 29 April 2018 at National Stadium, Ta' Qali. The draw for the Semi-finals was held on 23 April 2018. The four clubs left were all from Maltese Premier League. Balzan were the only club remaining in the competition that had never won the Maltese FA Trophy in the past. Both Semi-final matches were Live on TVM2

Final
The final was played on 5 May 2018.

Birkirkara reached their tenth Maltese FA Trophy final having won it five times. Valletta reached their twenty-third final and had won it thirteen times previously.

Birkirkara and Valletta have met together in Maltese FA Trophy final twice before, having previously met in 1999 and 2001.
When meeting in the finals, Valletta have both times.

The last time Birkirkara and Valletta met together in Maltese FA Trophy was during the 2015-16 fourth round when Birkirkara beat Valletta by 1-0.

Television rights
The following matches were broadcast live on TVM2:

See also
 2017–18 Maltese Premier League

References

External links
 The official FA Trophy website
 The Maltese FA Trophy on UEFA

Malta
Maltese FA Trophy seasons
Cup